The Bass River Township School District is a non-operating public school district that serves students from Bass River Township, in Burlington County, New Jersey, United States.

Based on the results of a study performed by the Southern Regional Institute and Educational Technology Training Center of Stockton University, and in the wake of declining enrollment and rising costs, the district decided tp send all of its PreK-6 students to the Little Egg Harbor Township School District, starting in the 2020-21 school year. The board of education will oversee what becomes a non-operating district.

As of the 2018–19 school year, the district, comprising one school, had an enrollment of 106 students and 12.8 classroom teachers (on an FTE basis), for a student–teacher ratio of 8.3:1. In the 2016–17 school year, Bass River had the 10th-smallest enrollment of any school district in the state, with 102 students.

The district is classified by the New Jersey Department of Education as being in District Factor Group "CD", the sixth-highest of eight groupings. District Factor Groups organize districts statewide to allow comparison by common socioeconomic characteristics of the local districts. From lowest socioeconomic status to highest, the categories are A, B, CD, DE, FG, GH, I and J.

Students in seventh through twelfth grades attend the schools of the Pinelands Regional School District, which also serves students from Eagleswood Township, Little Egg Harbor Township and Tuckerton Borough. Schools in the district (with 2018–19 enrollment data from the National Center for Education Statistics) are 
Pinelands Regional Junior High School with 811 students in grades 7-9 and 
Pinelands Regional High School with 744 students in grades 10–12. The district's board of education includes nine members directly elected by the residents of the constituent municipalities to three-year terms on a staggered basis, with three seats up for election each year. Bass River Township is allocated one of the nine seats.

Schools
Bass River Township Elementary School served 106 students in grades PreK-6 (as of the 2018–19 school year, per the National Center for Education Statistics)

Administration
Core members of the district's administration are:
Siobhan Grayson, Superintendent
Nicholas Brown, Business Administrator / Board Secretary

Board of education
The district's board of education, comprising five members, sets policy and oversees the fiscal and educational operation of the district through its administration. As a Type II school district, the board's trustees are elected directly by voters to serve three-year terms of office on a staggered basis, with either one or two seats up for election each year held (since 2012) as part of the November general election. The board appoints a superintendent to oversee the day-to-day operation of the district.

References

External links
District website

School Data for the Bass River Township Elementary School, National Center for Education Statistics

Bass River Township, New Jersey
New Jersey District Factor Group CD
School districts in Burlington County, New Jersey
Public elementary schools in New Jersey